Issa Makhlouf is a Lebanese writer and poet who lives in Paris where he is currently the News Director at Radio Orient.
He obtained a doctorate in Cultural Anthropology at the Sorbonne and was professor at the University (E.S.I.T.) Paris III. Makhlouf also was a special UN Counsellor of Cultural and Social Affairs in the 61st session of the General Assembly (2006–2007).

Partial bibliography
A Star Slowed Down in Front of Death  (نجمة أمام الموت أبطأت), Ed. An-Nahar, Beirut 1981.
 Beyrut or the Fascination of Death (بيروت أو الافتتان بالموت), essay, Passion, Paris, 1988
 The Loneliness of Gold  (عزلة الذهب), ed. Al-Jadid, Beyrouth, 1992
 Distractions (هيامات), ed. André Biren, Paris, 1993
 The Eye of the Mirage (عين السراب), ed. An-Nahar, Beyrouth, 2000
 Mirages, éditions José Corti, Paris, 2004
 (Letter to the Two Sisters(Lettre aux deux sœurs), ed. José Corti, 2008
 A City in the Sky, Ed. Attanwir, Beirut, 2012

Sources
 Official Website

Living people
Lebanese writers
Lebanese journalists
University of Paris alumni
Year of birth missing (living people)